Satan's Slave is a 1980 Indonesian horror film directed by Sisworo Gautama Putra. The plot follows a wealthy family who have stopped practicing their Muslim faith and are tormented by the undead after their mother dies. It has achieved cult status among fans of Asian horror films, principally because it has been unavailable for many years, except as an obscure Japanese VHS pressing with no English subtitles. In 2006, Brentwood Home Video, a specialist US label, released an uncut print on DVD for retail release as part of its Eastern Horror series. Among Western fans, it is notable for being one of the few classic horror films to substitute Christian or Buddhist themes for Muslim beliefs. The film bears a resemblance in plot to Don Coscarelli's 1979 film Phantasm. A remake, directed by Joko Anwar, was released on September 28, 2017, and it was a box office success met with critical acclaim. In May 2020, Severin Films released Satan's Slave on Blu-ray with a new scan of the original negative and new interviews with producer Gope T. Samtani, screenwriter Imam Tantowi, and remake director Joko Anwar.

Plot
Mawarti, the mother, who dies from mysterious illness, leaves behind her work-obsessed businessman husband Munarto, quiet and introverted son Tomi, party girl and extroverted daughter Rita, and their sickly but religious servant Mr. Karto. On the first night after Mawarti's death, Tomi sees his dead mother, but he does not talk to her. The next day, Tomi takes the advice of his friend and visits a fortune teller, who warns that his whole family is in great danger and may die, and advises him to fortify himself with black magic.

Tomi becomes strange and withdrawn. Rita's boyfriend, Herman, says that for 40 days after a person dies, that person's spirit will linger at the house. Shortly after Herman’s visit, a new housekeeper named Darminah arrives, allegedly sent by an acquaintance of their father to look after the house. That night, after a party, Rita is scared when she sees a kuntilanak.

Herman warns that Darminah is not the kind of person to be trusted, and offers to consult a shaman about the situation the next day. Mr. Karto also begins to notice her strange and suspicious behavior. Tomi meets with a kyai at a bookstore, who advises him to begin performing his religious prayers, but when he tries to begin, a kuntilanak appears and commands him to stop. The next day, Tomi finds Mr. Karto's corpse, hung. Later that day, Herman is also killed when he is run over by a truck after nearly colliding with the mysterious Darminah. That night, Tomi and Rita agree that the ghosts in their home must be removed. When Rita leaves, she is chased by the now-undead Herman. The next morning, Rita and Tomi tell their father to call a shaman, who does so. Upon his arrival, the hired shaman is attacked by broken glass and flower petals. Rita, Tomi, and Munarto watched in horror as the shaman's head is impaled and pelted by a spinning chandelier.

When everything is over, Darminah sneaks out, but Tomi follows her to the cemetery, where the sinister housekeeper meets with the now-undead Herman and Mr. Karto and then raises Mawarti, ordering her to kill her family. When they notice Tomi spying on them, they give chase, but he escapes. At home, Tomi immediately warns his father and sister about Darminah. Rita believes him, but their father dismisses his warning. He takes them to check Darminah's room, but she is somehow already there.

The next day, the siblings dig up their mother's grave to confirm that her body is still there. When they return, the entire family is assaulted by the undead: Herman pursues Rita, Mr. Karto haunts Tomi, and Mawarti harasses Munarto. They escape into the dining room, only to find Darminah there holding a skull and frizzy hair. It is revealed that Darminah is a demon who preys on those of weak Islamic faith. After being terrorized and dying without repentance, those people become slaves to the devil in hell.

The family runs to the front door and opens it to flee, only to discover the kyai and his supporters there to help. Together, they confront Darminah and the three zombies with the letter of the Qur'an, which sets them all on fire. The film ends with Munarto, Tomi, and Rita, all newly re-converted to Islam, returning from the mosque to their car. The camera reveals that the woman in the car next to them is Darminah.

Cast
 W.D. Mochtar as Munarto
 Siska Widowati as Rita
 Fachrul Rozy as Tomi
 I.M. Damsyik as Pak Karto
 Ruth Pelupessy as Darminah
 Diana Suarkom as Mawarti
 Simon Cader as Herman
 Doddy Sukma as Pak Kiai

References

External links

1980 films
1980 horror films
1980s Indonesian-language films
Films shot in Indonesia
1980s supernatural horror films
Folk horror films
Indonesian supernatural horror films
Demons in film
Indonesian zombie films
1980s exploitation films
Films directed by Sisworo Gautama Putra
Religious horror films